Murphy is a city in suburban Collin County, Texas, United States. The 2020 census reported the population as 21,013, compared to 3,099 in 2000. Murphy is located northeast of Dallas and has a history that goes back to the late 1800s.

History
Attracted by the offer of land grants from the Peters colony, the first settlers of the community arrived in the area in 1846. The original townsite, located on land owned by C. A. McMillen, was first called "Old Decator", after McMillen's hometown, and later, "Maxwell's Branch". When the St. Louis Southwestern Railway reached the area in 1888, the residents renamed the town "Murphy", in honor of William Murphy, who provided land for the tracks and the construction of a depot. A post office was established there in 1891. From the 1880s until the 1950s Murphy served as a shipping point for area farmers and stock raisers. The Great Depression, the mechanization of farming, and job opportunities in the Dallas metropolitan area contributed to a decline in the population of Murphy. Though the rural community was never very large, its population was reduced to 150 by the mid-1950s and to 135 by 1961. Mail service was discontinued in 1954. The community was incorporated as a city in 1958. Beginning in the mid-1970s, however, the population increased dramatically. The establishment of businesses in nearby Plano and Richardson made Murphy a commuter community for these two cities. In 1970 there were 261 residents reported in Murphy. That figure had risen to 1,547 in 1990.

Few reminders of Murphy's early heyday remain; one structure still in use is the First Baptist Church of Murphy, built in 1901. Although the business district faded out, the school system remained for some time. The school building which housed elementary and high school students was built in 1938 as a WPA project. When it closed in 1950, the school children transferred to Plano. Later, citizens renovated the school building, which became the Community Center, Fire Station, and City Hall.  The Fire Station was named after local businessman and Level III Sommelier John A. Wisniowski.  Later, the City Hall and Fire Station were moved to a new municipal complex across the street, leaving the old building to be renovated as the Community Center that reopened in February 2012.

Geography
Murphy is located in southern Collin County, within the Dallas–Fort Worth metroplex. Murphy shares borders with Plano to the west, Richardson to the southwest, Sachse to the south, Wylie to the east, and Parker to the north.

Several subdivisions have begun building and are occupied. The country living theme is expressed in this development by a linear park, which includes a hike-and-bike trail. Murphy Marketplace is the dominant shopping center in the city. Built in 2008, the center now contains numerous restaurants and services and encompasses the northeast quadrant of the North Murphy Road and East FM 544 Intersection. The municipal complex comprises a total of five buildings to serve Fire, Police, City Administration, and Public Works, as well as a 2014 addition of the PSA Murphy sports center.

With the opening of the President George Bush Turnpike, access to the west became a reality in 1999. The highway is a major factor in the growth of the economy of southeast Collin County. Its impact on Murphy has already been felt in the rapid expansion as new homes have been built, with the boom starting in 1999. The population in late 2002 was about 6,500 and continued to grow to around 12,000 in 2006. The 2010 census reported a population of 17,708. The city was rated #7 in the "Best Places to Live" survey of Dallas Suburbs in the July 2008 D Magazine, and #9 in the 2010 edition of the article. (By comparison Dallas was #54, and neighboring Plano was #18.) In 2011 the city was rated #27 in America by "Money's list of America's best small towns".  In 2017 Murphy was ranked #2 among over 35,000 US cities and towns, without regard to size, by the "Area Vibes" web site.

Climate 
Murphy is considered to be part of the humid subtropical region.

Demographics

As of the 2020 United States census, there were 21,013 people, 5,659 households, and 5,143 families residing in the city. As of the census of 2000, there were 3,099 people, 1,030 households, and 909 families residing in the city. The population density was 589.7 people per square mile (227.9/km2). There were 1,126 housing units at an average density of 214.3 per square mile (82.8/km2).

Per 2000's census the racial makeup of the city was 76.06% White, 9.52% African American, 1.10% Native American, 9.07% Asian, 2.00% from other races, and 2.26% from two or more races. Hispanic or Latino of any race were 4.94% of the population.

There were 1,030 households, out of which 82.7% had children under the age of 18 living with them, 83.8% were married couples living together, 2.9% had a female householder with no husband present, and 10.8% were non-families. 8.3% of all households were made up of individuals, and 6.5% had someone living alone who was 65 years of age or older.  The average household size was 2.73 and the average family size was 3.18.

The median age for residents in Murphy is 33.9 (this is younger than the average age in the U.S.).

Families (non-single residences) represent 88.3% of the population, giving Murphy a higher than average concentration of families.

In the city, the population was spread out, with 29.7% under the age of 18, 5.1% from 18 to 24, 37.8% from 25 to 44, 20.5% from 45 to 64, and 5.0% who were 65 years of age or older.  The median age was 33.9 years. For every 100 females, there were 100.5 males.  For every 100 females age 18 and over, there were 100 males.

By 2019, the average household income had risen to $146,779, and the average income for a family was $147,818. The median income for men was $86,601 and the median for women was $61,221. The per capita income for the city was $39,934. About 4.7% of the population were below the poverty line including 2.8% under age 18 and 5.9% over the age of 65.

Murphy is located in Collin County, the wealthiest county in Texas and one of the wealthiest 1% of counties in the United States.  The four zip codes of Collin County that contribute to the county's affluence are (in descending order of median household income/year): 75093, 75024, 75025, and 75094.

Government
The city of Murphy adopted a Home Rule Charter in 2003, and the power of the city is vested in a council of elected individuals who regulate and legislate and appoint other officials, such as the City Manager, who heads the executive branch. The city council members as of 2020 are Scott Bradley (Mayor), Jene Butler, Jennifer Berthiaume, Andrew Chase, Sarah Fincannon, Ken Oltmann and Elizabeth Abraham. Scott Bradley was elected mayor in 2017. Mike Castro is the city manager.

Politics 
Murphy, like the rest of Collin County, was solidly Republican throughout the early 2000s, but it has shifted significantly towards the Democratic Party in recent elections, culminating in Democrat Joe Biden's narrow victory in the city in 2020.

NBC Dateline deal
The Murphy police department made a deal with "Dateline" in 2006 to allow NBC camera crews to record stings of alleged Internet sexual predators and to let people hired by "Dateline" actually set up and run the sting. The production ended tragically when one of the alleged offenders, Louis Conradt, an assistant district attorney from a neighboring county, committed suicide when Dateline NBC cameras showed up at his home in the company of Murphy police after the man failed to show up to the sting house.

Education

Primary and secondary schools

Public schools

A portion of Murphy is served by the Plano Independent School District, while another portion is served by the Wylie Independent School District.

Plano Independent School District

The Plano ISD section of Murphy is served by the following schools:

Elementary schools (separate attendance boundaries):
 Boggess Elementary School (Murphy)
 Martha Hunt Elementary School (Murphy)
 Miller Elementary School (Richardson)

Middle schools (separate attendance boundaries):
 Armstrong Middle School (Plano)
 Murphy Middle School (Murphy)

High schools:
 McMillen High School (Grades 9–10) (Murphy) (opened fall 2011)
 Plano East Senior High School (Grades 11–12) (Plano)

Prior to the opening of McMillen, T. H. Williams High School in Plano served Murphy.

Wylie Independent School District

The Wylie ISD section of Murphy is served by the following schools:

Elementary schools (separate attendance boundaries)
 Harry and Retha Tibbals Elementary School (K–4) (Murphy)
 Don Whitt Elementary School (K–4) (Wylie ISD, located in Sachse)

Secondary schools
 Draper Intermediate School (5–6) (Wylie)
 Raymond B. Cooper Junior High School (7–8) (Wylie)
 Wylie High School (9–12) (Wylie)

References

 "About Murphy." Murphy, Texas. City of Murphy. Web. 07 Feb. 2011. <https://web.archive.org/web/20110203130624/http://www.murphytx.org/home/>.
 Murphy, Texas. Web. 07 Feb. 2011. <https://web.archive.org/web/20110203130624/http://www.murphytx.org/home/>.

External links
 City of Murphy official website
 Murphy Economic Development
 The Murphy Monitor
 

Populated places established in 1873
Dallas–Fort Worth metroplex
Cities in Texas
Cities in Collin County, Texas